is a municipality in Innlandet county, Norway. It is located in the traditional district of Hedemarken. The administrative centre of the municipality is the village of Stangebyen. Other villages include Bekkelaget, Espa, Bottenfjellet, Ilseng, Ottestad, Sandvika, Sinnerud, Starhellinga, Tangen, and Romedal.

The  municipality is the 157th largest by area out of the 356 municipalities in Norway. Stange is the 59th most populous municipality in Norway with a population of 21,156.

General information

The parish of Stange was established as a municipality on 1 January 1838 (see formannskapsdistrikt law). During the 1960s, there were many municipal mergers across Norway due to the work of the Schei Committee. On 1 January 1964, the neighboring municipalities of Romedal (population: 6,441) and Stange (population: 9,734) were merged to form a new, larger municipality of Stange with a population of 16,175 residents. On 13 July 1956, a small part of the municipality of Vang (population: 24) was transferred to Stange municipality.

Name
The municipality (originally the parish) is named after the old Stange farm, since the first Stange Church was built there. (The farm is lying on a long hill, and this is probably the background for the name.)

Coat of arms
The coat of arms was granted on 20 June 1986. The arms show a white or silver-colored medieval plough called an ard on a green background. It symbolizes this historic importance of agriculture in the area; originally the growing of grains and then later growing potatoes. The arms were designed by Arne Løvstad.

Churches
The Church of Norway has five parishes within the municipality of Stange. It is part of the Hamar domprosti (arch-deanery) in the Diocese of Hamar.

Media
The newspaper Stangeavisa has been published in Stange since 2004.

History

Archeological finds indicate agricultural settlements in the area well before the Viking Age. Since the shortest route from the south to Hamar went through the area, there have also been trade and hospitality there since time immemorial. Stange has its own historical association that publishes articles, short research topics, as well as authoritative works on the area's history.

Stange Church is located in Stangebyen. The church is mentioned in 1225 in Håkon Håkonsen's saga and the current church building was constructed around the year 1250.

The Atlungstad Distillery was established in Stange in 1855.

Geography
The municipality is situated on the east side of the lake Mjøsa. It borders the municipalities of Hamar on the north; Løten, Våler, and Åsnes to the east; Nord-Odal to the south; and Eidsvoll to the west.

The municipality can be roughly divided into two areas: the northern area, with rich and fertile agricultural land; and a southern area with craggy, forested area (the Stange Commons). As a result, the northern section is dominated by large, prosperous farms; the southern part by small, marginal farms. The rivers Lageråa and Svartelva both run through the municipality.

Government
All municipalities in Norway, including Stange, are responsible for primary education (through 10th grade), outpatient health services, senior citizen services, unemployment and other social services, zoning, economic development, and municipal roads. The municipality is governed by a municipal council of elected representatives, which in turn elects a mayor.  The municipality falls under the Østre Innlandet District Court and the Eidsivating Court of Appeal.

Municipal council
The municipal council  of Stange is made up of 35 representatives that are elected to four year terms. The party breakdown of the council is as follows:

Mayors
The mayors of Stange (incomplete list):
1923-1926: Martin Hestnæs (Ap)
1926–1945: Kristian Fjeld (Ap)
1946–1951: Christian Stensbak (Ap)
1952–1975: Arnljot Johnstad (Ap)	
1976–1983: Jens K. Nybruket (Ap)
1984–2007: Jan Tyriberget (Ap)
2007–2022: Nils A. Røhne (Ap) 	
2022–present: Bjarne H. Christiansen (Ap)

Twin towns – sister cities

Stange has sister city agreements with the following places:
 Botkyrka, Sweden
 Brøndby, Denmark

Notable people 

 Bolette Gjør (1835–1909) a Norwegian writer and inner missionary, brought up in  Romedal
 Otto Blehr (1847 in Stange – 1927) attorney and Prime Minister of Norway 1902 to 1903
 Holm Hansen Munthe (1848 in Stange – 1898) a Norwegian architect of the Dragon Style
 Kristoffer Olsen Oustad (1857 in Romedal – 1943) Norwegian-American engineer, built bridges
 Hulda Garborg (1862 at Såstad farm – 1934) novelist, playwright, poet, folk dancer and theatre instructor; kindled interest in the bunad tradition
 Eiliv Austlid (1899–1940) a farmer and army officer, lived at Såstad Søndre farm from 1924
 Ingrid Semmingsen (1910–1995) first female professor of history in Norway, grew up in Stange
 Odvar Nordli (1927 in Tangen – 2018) a politician and Prime Minister of Norway 1976 to 1981
 Nils A. Røhne (born 1949 in Stange) a Norwegian politician, Mayor of Stange from 2007 
 Linda Bakke (born 1973) a Norwegian artist, lives in Stange
 Trygve Slagsvold Vedum (born 1978) leader of the Centre Party, grew up in Romedal 
 Bård Lahn (born 1983 in Stange) a Norwegian environmentalist with Natur og Ungdom

Sport 
 Trygve Brudevold (born 1920 in Stange – 2021) a bobsledder, competed at the 1956 Winter Olympics
 Ole Holm (1870 in Stange – 1956) rifle shooter, team silver medallist, 1906 Summer Olympics
 Eskil Rønningsbakken (born 1979 in Vallset) does dangerous balancing acts and tightrope walking

References

External links

Municipal fact sheet from Statistics Norway 
Municipal website 

 
Municipalities of Innlandet
1838 establishments in Norway